Eric Limeback (born November 5, 1992) is a Canadian speedcuber. He is known for his 11/11 3x3x3 multiblindfold Canadian record solve, as well as his standard 3x3x3 blindfolded solving. Limeback was the first Canadian to record a sub-30 second official 3x3x3 blindfolded solve.
Limeback began solving the Rubik's Cube in 9th grade. He graduated from Marc Garneau Collegiate Institute in 2010.
He formerly held the Guinness World Record for the most 3x3x3 cubes solved in 24 hours, 5800, set from 3–4 October 2013 at Wilfrid Laurier University, Canada.

Rubik's cubes
Eric Limeback first began solving Rubik's Cubes at the age of 14 in 2007. Within five months he had entered a Canadian National speedcubing competition, and managed to finish in the top 25 in the country. In 2009 a YouTube video of him solving 11 cubes blindfolded aired on an Oprah Winfrey Show segment. By 2010 he had become one of Canada's top solvers, with a personal best time of as little as 7.1 seconds to solve a fully scrambled cube. He came to national attention in August of that year, becoming involved in a project to create Rubik's Cube mosaics worth tens of thousands of dollars. In 2011 he was the subject of a short documentary called The Cuber for the National Screen Institute. At this time he was already the second fastest cuber in the country. By 2013 he had broken a total of eight Canadian Rubik's records, and was also ranked first in Canada for solving Rubik's cubes blindfolded.

World Record
On 3–4 October 2013 Eric Limeback set a world record for solving the most Rubik's Cubes in a 24-hour period. He set the record at Wilfrid Laurier University in Waterloo, Ontario. He had ten cubes set up in front of him for the record breaking attempt, with a team of volunteers randomly mixing up the cubes and handing them back to keep a cube in his hands at all times. In total he solved a Rubik's cube 5,800 times in 24 hours, ending just before 1 pm Friday. He broke the previous record of 4,786 with 4 hours and 7 minutes left. He finished the 5,800th cube in 23 hours, 59 minutes and 59.7 seconds, with an average solve time of 14.89 seconds per cube.

National Records
Limeback formerly held the following Canadian speedcubing records:

2x2x2 single (North American record)
3x3x3 average
4x4x4 average
3x3x3 blindfolded single
Rubik's Clock Single
Rubik's Clock Average
Square-1 single
Square-1 average
4x4x4 blindfolded single
3x3x3 multiblindfold (multiple 3x3x3 cubes blindfolded)

See also

References

External links
Eric's Official WCA Results
Eric's Official 11/11 BLD
Eric's Official 9.55 Second Solve

Canadian speedcubers
1991 births
Living people